Vali (also Romanized as Valī) is a village in Jayezan Rural District, Jayezan District, Omidiyeh County, Khuzestan Province, Iran. At the 2006 census, its population was 358, in 70 families.

References 

Populated places in Omidiyeh County